Amphidromus similis is a species of air-breathing land snail, a terrestrial pulmonate gastropod mollusk in the family Camaenidae.

Distribution 
Borneo

References

External links 

similis
Gastropods described in 1900